This is a list of years in Barbados. See also the timeline of Barbadian history.  For only articles about years in Barbados that have been written, see :Category:Years in Barbados.

Twenty-first century

Twentieth century

Nineteenth century

Eighteenth century

See also 
 List of years by country

 
Barbados history-related lists
Barbados